Baltasi can refer to:

 Baltasi
 Baltaşı, Erzincan
 Baltaşı, Palu